Tamaz Stephania Stadium is a multi-use stadium in Bolnisi, Georgia.  It is used mostly for football matches and is the home stadium of FC Sioni Bolnisi. The stadium is able to hold 3,000 people.

The stadium is named after Tamaz Stepania, - former player, who was a goalkeeper for Dinamo Tbilisi. He died in a road accident at the age of 21.

References

Sports venues in Georgia (country)
Football venues in Georgia (country)
Buildings and structures in Kvemo Kartli
Bolnisi
FC Sioni Bolnisi